Face 2 Face is a Kannada romantic thriller film directed by Sandeep Janardhan. The film was released on 15 March 2019.

Plot 
The film revolves around three characters: Santhosh, Sneha and Preethi. Santhosh is in love with Preethi, but a small incident changes the situation. Santhosh struggles to get his love back with the help of Sneha, who has just applied for a divorce from her husband. This continues to show three parallel stories - one about the possessive mother, a romantic story and a tale of a friendship.

Cast 
 Rohith Bhanuprakash as Santhosh
 Divya Uruduga as Sneha
 Purvi Joshi as Preethi
 Aaryan Achukatla as Vikruth
 Suchendra Prasad
 Veena Sunder
 Yamuna Srinidhi

Soundtrack

Release

Theatrical 
The film released  on 15 March 2019.

Critical reception

Reviewer Shashiprasad S. M from Deccan Chronicle gave the film a rating of 3/5 and wrote "the entertaining surprises coupled with dialogues and the performances of the characters elevates face to face to another level. There are also good number of negatives in the narrative when it starts throwing away too much of information but the end is what matters to make it a good watch"Vivek M V of Deccan Herald  gave the film a rating of 3/5 and stated "The film also tries to fit in nods to current affairs like the growing debate on dubbing in Kannada and the growing competition between telephone networks. It aims a sly dig at film critics."A The New Indian Express critic A Sharadhaa gave the film a rating of 2.5/5 and says" Technically, Face 2 Face has its own cinematic beauty, credit for which goes to cinematographer Vishwajith Rao,whose picturisation explains the story better."

References

External links 
 

2019 films
2010s Kannada-language films
2010s romantic thriller films
Indian romantic thriller films
2019 romance films
2019 thriller films